Phloen Chit or Ploenchit is the name of a road, an intersection and its neighbourhood in Bangkok. The name may also refer to:

Phloen Chit BTS Station
Ploenchit Fair, a fund-raising fair for charity projects throughout the Kingdom of Thailand
Sor Ploenchit, a Muay Thai gym associated with the following boxers:
Saen Sor Ploenchit (born 1972), Thai boxer
Suriya Prasathinphimai, also known as Suriya Sor Ploenchit (born 1980), Thai boxer